Darko Perović (born June 14, 1965, in Aranđelovac) is a Serbian comic-book and graphic novel creator, known best for his comics "Brek" (written by himself), "Magico Vento", "Shangai Devil" and "Adam Wild" (all written by Gianfranco Manfredi), "Les Carnets secrets du Vatican" (written by Hervé Loiselet alias "Novy"), "Alamo" (written by Olivier Dobremel alias "Dobbs"), Dr Watson (written by Stephan Betbeder)

He works for Serbian, French, Italian and Spanish publishers and lives in Belgrade.

External links
 Darko Perović, Sergio Bonelli Editore (official site) 
 Bio sur Bedetheque.com 
 Darko Perović, blog (Serbian)

1965 births
Living people
People from Aranđelovac
Serbian comics artists
Serbian comics writers
Serbian artists